Peter Kambasis (born 22 September 1974) is a Canadian-born writer/director. He graduated from Ryerson University (Toronto, Ontario, Canada) in June 1999, where he received his Bachelor of Applied Arts in Film Production. It was there that he began to produce short film projects primarily for the internet.

Before graduating, Peter had won Best Fiction Film at the Student Film and Video Festival in Montreal 1998 for his short film It's Not Easy Being Greek.

After working for numerous internet companies, he landed work at a Post-Production Sound Company called Trackworks Inc., where he worked as an Editing Assistant, and eventually, Sound Editor. There he worked with such directors as Atom Egoyan (Sweet Hereafter, Ararat), Don McKellar (Childstar), Bruce McDonald (Picture Claire, Hard Core Logo) and Paul Schrader (Autofocus). At that time, he also produced a few internet-only projects, including a series called, "The Wife Beaters" about two controversial rappers.

Along with recording ADR and other sound effects, Peter had also performed voice-over work in numerous films and TV shows that include: "I Was A Sixth Grade Alien", "Picture Claire", "Ararat", and "Auto Focus".

Peter continues to write, direct and sometimes act in projects for his website: Kambasis.com.

Awards 
 The Carbon Freeze Sequence (2006) "Award for Best Creativity (Jedi)" – Directed by Peter Kambasis. Produced by Michael Longfield, Michael Dobbin, Amy Carroll and Victor Szabo. Voiced by Michael Dobbin, Michael Longfield, Peter Kambasis and Amy Carroll. Music by Victor Szabo. 
 Yeah I'm Hip Hop (2004) Runner Up – 3rd Annual Hub (Formally "Toronto Computes!") Digital Video Contest. Written, Directed and Starring Peter Kambasis. 
 Bowlin' (2001) 1st prize at the 1st Annual Toronto Computes! Digital Video Contest. Peter starred in this film. 
 It's Not Easy Being Greek (1998) “Best Fiction Film” at the Student Film and Video Festival in Montreal 1998 & Special Commendation 1998 CIAFF Awards. Written, Directed and Starring Peter Kambasis.

References

External links 
 
 Peter Kambasis Official Website.
 Peter Kambasis on About Me.

1974 births
Living people
Canadian male screenwriters
Film directors from Toronto
Writers from Toronto
20th-century Canadian screenwriters
20th-century Canadian male writers
21st-century Canadian screenwriters
21st-century Canadian male writers